Armăşeni may refer to several villages in Romania:

 Armăşeni, a village in Ciucsângeorgiu Commune, Harghita County
 Armăşeni, a village in Băcești Commune, Vaslui County
 Armăşeni, a village in Bunești-Averești Commune, Vaslui County